Lillian Bassman (June 15, 1917 – February 13, 2012) was an American photographer and painter.

Early life and background
Her parents were Jewish intellectuals who emigrated to the United States from Ukraine (then in Russia) in 1905 and settled in Brooklyn, New York. She grew up in Brooklyn and Greenwich Village, New York, and studied at the Textile High School in Manhattan with future artist Alexey Brodovitch and graduated in 1933.

Career
From the 1940s until the 1960s Bassman worked as a fashion photographer for Junior Bazaar and later at Harper's Bazaar where she promoted the careers of photographers such as Richard Avedon, Robert Frank, Louis Faurer and Arnold Newman. Under the guidance of the Russian emigrant, Alexey Brodovitch, she began to photograph her model subjects primarily in black and white. Her work was published for the most part in Harper's Bazaar from 1950 to 1965.

By the 1970s Bassman's interest in pure form in her fashion photography was out of vogue. She turned to her own photo projects and abandoned fashion photography. In doing so she tossed out 40 years of negatives and prints—her life's work. A forgotten bag filled with hundreds of images was discovered over 20 years later. Bassman's fashion photographic work began to be re-appreciated in the 1990s.
 
She worked with digital technology and abstract color photography into her nineties to create a new series of work. She used Photoshop for her image manipulation.

The most notable qualities about her photographic work are the high contrasts between light and dark, the graininess of the finished photos, and the geometric placement and camera angles of the subjects. Bassman became one of the last great woman photographers in the world of fashion. A generation later, Bassman's pioneering photography and her mentor Alexey Brodovitch's bold cropping and layout innovations were a seminal influence on Sam Haskins and his black and white work of the sixties.

Bassman died on February 13, 2012, at age 94.

Personal life
She first met her future husband, photographer Paul Himmel (born 1914), at Coney Island at age six. They met again at 13, and started living together when she was 15. They were married in 1935, and had two children. Himmel died in 2009 after 73 years of marriage.

Notable works 

 Anneliese Seubert, 1997
 It's a Cinch, 1951
 Betty Beihn, Nude I, 1950/2012

Exhibitions (selection) 
 1974: Staempfli Gallery, New York
 1993: Howard Greenberg Gallery, New York
 1993: "Vanité", Palais de Tokyo
 1994: Jackson Fine Art Gallery, Atlanta, Georgia
 1994: "Homage to Lillian Bassman," Caroussel du Louvre, Paris
 1997: Fashion Institute of Technology, New York
 1997: Peter Fetterman Gallery, Los Angeles
 1999: "Les dames de Bazaar" Rencontres de la photographie, Arles 
 2002: Garden Prado, Madrid
 2003: Galerie f5, 6 in Munich, Germany
 2004: Staley Wise Gallery, New York
 2005: Farmani Gallery, Los Angeles, USA
 2005: A touch of mystery - Triennale der Photographie Hamburg 2005, Photography Monika Mohr Galerie, Hamburg
 2006: Selektion # 1 - Arbeiten in Schwarz/Weiß, Galerie f 5,6, München
 2006: Retrospective, Peter Fetterman Gallery, Santa Monica, USA
 2010: Retrospective, The Wapping Project, London, UK
 2009-2010: Retrospective, The Deichtorhallen, Hamburg, Germany
 2014: "Signature of Elegance," Chanel Nexus Hall, Tokyo, Japan 
 2014-2015: Retrospective, Kunst Haus Wien, Vienna, Austria
 2016: Edwynn Houk Gallery, New York, USA

References

Further reading
 Johannesson, Ika., editor. Hall of Femmes: Lillian Bassman. Stockholm: Oyster Press, 2010.
 Lillian Bassman & Paul Himmel : die erste Retrospektive = the first retrospective. Heidelberg : Kehrer, 2009.
 Solomon, Deborah. Lillian Bassman: Women. New York Abrams, 2009.

External links
Photographs by Lillian Bassman
 "Lillian Bassman--Then and Now"
 William Grimes, "Lillian Bassman, Fashion and Fine-Art Photographer, Dies at 94", The New York Times, 2012/02/14.

American photographers
People from Brooklyn
American people of Ukrainian-Jewish descent
1917 births
2012 deaths
American women photographers
Fashion photographers
People from Greenwich Village
21st-century American women